Case Closed: The Time Bombed Skyscraper, known as  in Japan, is a 1997 Japanese animated feature film based on Gosho Aoyama's Case Closed manga series and featuring detective Jimmy Kudo. The film takes place between episodes 54 and 55. Funimation released the film in North America.

Plot 

While sorting mail at Dr. Agasa's house, Conan finds an invitation addressed to Jimmy from Leo Joel, a famous architect. Jimmy calls Rachel using his voice-changing bowtie and asks her to go in his place. Rachel agrees, on the condition that Jimmy goes to a movie with her on Saturday.

On Saturday morning, Conan receives a call from a strange man, who challenges Jimmy to a game. Conan accepts the challenge, and the mystery caller gives him clues leading to bombs hidden all over Tokyo. Conan finds and destroys every one. Because of the locations of the bombs - near structures designed by Joel - Conan deduces that the bomber is Joel, who planned to destroy his "inferior" works and create a perfect new building. Upon his arrest, Joel reveals the location for his final bombs: Beika City Building, the location of Jimmy and Rachel's date.

The bombs explode and seal the entrances and exits, trapping Rachel and others inside. Conan makes his way through the collapsing building, but a warped door blocks him off from Rachel. Using his tie and cell phone, he calls Rachel and asks her to look for the bomb. Rachel finds it in a large shopping bag. To disarm the bomb, Jimmy tells Rachel which wires to cut. However, Joel made two extra wires, one red, one blue. One of them is booby-trapped, but Jimmy has no idea which. Jimmy tells Rachel to cut either one. As the rescue team arrives and carries him away, Jimmy realizes that Joel knew that Rachel's favorite color was red and booby-trapped the red one. In the last few minutes, Rachel makes a desperate decision and cuts the blue wire because the red wire represents the red string of fate between Jimmy and herself.

Cast

Production 
For the last scene of the film, an "episode" that original creator Gosho Aoyama wanted to include in the manga was used. He even got to draw the originals himself.

Music

Release 

The film was released in 13 theaters in Japan on April 19, 1997. On opening weekend, it grossed ¥8,554,500 ($68,965).

Home media

VHS
The VHS of the film was released on October 19, 1997. Its production was discontinued after switching to DVD in 2006.

Region 1 DVD
Funimation released the English dub of The Time Bombed Skyscraper on bilingual DVD on October 3, 2006. Unlike the series, the film left the original animation entirely intact with no translations except for the opening title and ending credits. The opening title was replaced with an English version. The original Japanese credits were changed from a tour of Tokyo and recap of the film to a capture of the final shot of the film (an aerial view of the characters and police cars at the crime scene).

Region 2 DVD
The DVD of the film was released on March 28, 2001. A new DVD was released on February 25, 2011, significantly lowering the original price and added the trailer as a special feature.

Blu-ray
The Blu-ray version of the film was released on August 26, 2011. The Blu-ray contains the same content as the DVD plus a mini-booklet explaining the film and the BD-live function.

References

External links 
 
 

Films set in Tokyo
Time-Bombed Skyscraper
1997 anime films
Funimation
Films directed by Kenji Kodama
TMS Entertainment
Toho animated films
Terrorism in fiction